Hilary Stebbing (1915-1996) was an artist, illustrator and children's author particularly associated with Puffin Books, and active in the United Kingdom from the 1940s to the 1960s.

Biography 
She was a student at the Central School of Arts and Crafts in the late 1930s, where she was a contemporary of Monica Walker and the stained-glass artist, conservator and author John ‘Jack’ Baker, whom she married in 1946.

Her woodblock print 'Heaven, Hell and Purgatory' was included in the annual Exhibition of the Society of Wood Engravers in 1939. It was shown again in the Society's Centenary Exhibition at the Ashmolean Museum in Oxford in 2020 and illustrated in the catalogue. It is also reproduced in Simon Lawrence’s history of the Society, Spitsticks and Multiples (Fleece Press 2022).

She exhibited at Court Lodge Gallery, Horton Kirby, Dartford, Derbyshire County Council Museum Service and Rye Society of Artists.

Works 
 Pantomime Stories, Puffin, 1943
 Maggie the Streamlined Taxi, The Transatlantic Arts Company Limited, 1943
 The Silly Rabbits. A tale, (Picture Book no. 19), Bantam, 1944
 The Animals Went in Two by Two, (Picture Book no. 20), Bantam, 1944
 Monty's New House, The Transatlantic Arts Company Limited, 1944
 Extinct Animals, Puffin, 1946
 Freddy and Ernest, the Dragons of Wellbottom Poggs, Puffin, 1946
 Living Animals, Cassell & Co. Ltd, 1954
 The Ten Pussy-Cats, Listen with Mother, BBC Light Programme, 1962

Legacy
The University of the Arts London (the successor to the Central School of Arts and Crafts) has six of Stebbing's works in its collection.

The two Bantam books, The Silly Rabbits and The Animals Went in Two by Two, were republished in a limited edition by Design for Today.

Two limited edition giclee prints were produced in 2022 to support development of the new House of Illustration at New River Head in Islington, London.

In October 2022, Stebbing was included alongside Kathleen Hale, Eric Ravilious, Edward Ardizzone, Pablo Picasso, and Henri Matisse in the exhibition 'Picture Books For All: the fine printing of W. S. Cowell Ltd.' at The Hold heritage centre in Ipswich.

References

Further reading 
 Joe Pearson, Drawn Direct to the Plate: Noel Carrington and the Puffin Picture Books, Penguin Collectors Society, 2010
 Ruth Artmonsky, Do You Want It Good Or Do You Want It Tuesday? The halcyon days of W.S. Cowell Ltd. Printers, Artmonsky Arts, 2012
 Joe Pearson, article in Illustration Magazine Autumn 2017. (the issue cover is a detail from a study Stebbing did for the Children’s Education posters)

External links 
 Hilary Stebbing archive

1915 births
1996 deaths
People from Henfield
20th-century British artists
British illustrators
British children's book illustrators
Alumni of the Central School of Art and Design